Siambr Trawsfynydd is a mountain in Ceredigion, Wales, located to the north of Pumlumon. It is 582 m (1,910 ft) above sea level and one of the higher summits of the area.
To the east is Glaslyn lake and the steep-sided Tarren Bwlch-Gwyn.

Mountains and hills of Ceredigion